Macleania loeseneriana is a species of plant in the family Ericaceae. It is endemic to Ecuador.

References

Vaccinioideae
Flora of Ecuador
Vulnerable plants
Taxonomy articles created by Polbot
Plants described in 1909